is a Japanese footballer currently playing as a midfielder for Nagano Parceiro.

Career statistics

Club
.

Notes

References

External links

1997 births
Living people
Japanese footballers
Association football midfielders
Kansai University alumni
J3 League players
Gamba Osaka players
AC Nagano Parceiro players